The Libertarian Party (LP) is a libertarian political party in the Netherlands founded in 1993. It hopes to develop "a free world, a world in which no one is forced to sacrifice his or her life and property for the benefit of others". Its founder is Toine Manders, who works for the Haags Juristen College. On 9 May 2015, Jasper de Groot was elected as chairman.

History 
The party took part in the Dutch general election of 1994, receiving 2,754 votes and no seats. After this, the party spent nearly two decades in 'hibernation', organizing lectures and events to spread its message, but not partaking in national elections. The party once again became active in 2012, and participated in the Dutch general election of 2012, receiving only 4,205 votes.

Since then, the party has participated in 10 municipal elections in 2013 and 2014, has elected a new chairman, and is in the process of expanding and modernizing. Since 2012, membership has increased noticeably, though the party remains unrepresented in any representative or legislative body. In 2014, the Libertarian Party was the first political party in The Netherlands to accept Bitcoin. The party also participated in the Dutch Provincial Election and participated in the 2017 general elections, but failed to win any seats, receiving only 1,492 votes.

Ideology 
The party platform is based on right-libertarian principles such as personal and economic liberty, respect for private property and self-ownership.

Positions 
 a negative income tax
 liberalization of drugs
 less bureaucracy and regulations
 non-interventionist foreign policy
 more autonomy for provinces and municipalities

Election results

Parliament

References

External links
 www.stemLP.nl (in Dutch)

Libertarian parties
Libertarian parties in the Netherlands
Liberal parties in the Netherlands
Non-interventionist parties
1993 establishments in the Netherlands
Political parties established in 1993